State Route 60 (SR 60) is an  state highway in Hale County in the west-central part of the U.S. state of Alabama. The western terminus of the highway is at an intersection with SR 14 at Wedgeworth. The eastern terminus of the highway is at an intersection with SR 69 at Havana.

Route description

SR 60 travels through rural areas of Alabama’s Black Belt. The highway heads to the northeast from its intersection with SR 14, not traveling through any incorporated communities. The highway is aligned along a two-lane road for its entire length.

Major intersections

See also

References

060
Transportation in Hale County, Alabama